Ronald L. Ellis (born July 4, 1950) is a United States magistrate judge of the United States District Court for the Southern District of New York.

Early life and education
Ellis was born in Lafourche Parish, Louisiana. He received his Bachelor of Arts in chemical engineering from Manhattan College in 1972 and his J.D. from New York University School of Law in 1975.

Legal career
Ellis passed the patent bar and was briefly a patent attorney.

He worked for the NAACP Legal Defense and Educational Fund as a staffer specializing in fair employment class action litigation (1976–1984), as director of the Fund's Fair Employment Program (1984–1990), and as director of its Poverty & Justice Program (1990–1993). He also served as an adjunct professor at the New York University School of Law, teaching employment law for two years at the graduate position and racism and American law for ten years at the undergraduate position. He taught as an adjunct professor at New York Law School for three years, as an instructor in a course in blacks and law.

While employed at the NAACP Fund, Ellis worked as a trial lawyer in six federal circuits in 12 states, dealing with voting rights, health care, housing, education, and environmental justice cases in addition to equal employment cases. He took part in eight appeals to the appellate courts in three of the circuits. He was the advocate for the respondents in oral argument before the U.S. Supreme Court in University of Tennessee v. Elliott (1986). 

Ellis has written on issues including trial procedures, witness examination, and statistical proof and has co-authored the chapter on "Achieving Race and Gender Fairness in the Courtroom" in The Judge's Book (2nd ed. 1994).

Judicial career
Ellis was sworn in on November 16, 1993 as a magistrate judge for the United States District Court for the Southern District of New York.

He gained national attention when he and Magistrate Judges Gabriel Gorenstein and Theodore Katz were assigned to the securities fraud case against Bernard Madoff case. On January 12, 2009, Ellis refused a request from federal prosecutors to revoke bail for Madoff, allowing him to remain confined to quarters and under guard in his $7 million penthouse apartment on the Upper East Side of Manhattan after Madoff was caught mailing an alleged valuable jewelry to relatives and friends.

Ellis is a member of the American Bar Association, the New York State Bar Association, the Federal Magistrate Judges Association, the Metropolitan Black Bar Association, and the Federal Bar Council.

On 10 September 2012 Judge Ellis refused to quash a subpoena from the United States government which demands the foreign media organisation BBC hand over out takes and portions of documentary, entitled Arafat Investigated to United States Authorities. This has prompted some in the media and UK public to question how the United States has jurisdiction over a foreign media organisation or media taped and stored outside the United States and fully funded by a foreign government. Judge Ellis took the controversial position, because the footage does not qualify as confidential without considering jurisdiction of the US Federal District Court.

On February 19, 2013, Judge Ellis ruled against the city of New York in regards the Ken Burns documentary about the Central Park Five. The city asserted that, when Mr. Burns said publicly he hoped the film would help push the city to settle with the mistakenly convicted individuals, he had given up journalistic protection from sub poena. The judge wrote in a footnote, "The manipulation of the [Burns] quote in this manner is troubling." He also said the city's comparisons of Burns to another documentary filmmaker, Joe Berlinger, were "misplaced". Berlinger had been forced to yield his outtakes for a film about Chevron operations in Ecuador because he had removed a scene at the request of his subjects.

References

External links
 Office of Magistrate Judge Ronald L. Ellis
A Profile of Ronald L. Ellis
The United States District Court for the Southern District of New York: A Retrospective (1990-2000) The New York County Lawyers’ Association Committee On The Federal Courts December 2002
Ronald L. Ellis Lecturer-in-Law at Columbia Law
Federal Bar Council Second Circuit Redbook, 2003–2004, Vincent C. Allexander and Anne D. Alexander (eds.).

New York (state) lawyers
1950 births
Living people
Manhattan College alumni
United States magistrate judges